Sir Robert Mark Wainwright KCMG (born 17 September 1967) is a British civil servant. He was the director of Europol from 16 April 2009 until 1 May 2018.

Education 
He was brought up in Pontyberem and attended Gwendraeth Grammar School. Wainwright was educated at the London School of Economics graduating with a BSc in 1989.

Career
He then worked for the United Kingdom's Security Service (MI5) as an intelligence analyst.

From 2000 to 2003, Wainwright was the UK Management Board member at Europol and a UK Liaison Officer. At the same time, he was Head of the British Europol National Unit in London.
In 2003 he was appointed Director of International Affairs of the UK's National Criminal Intelligence Service (NCIS), where he was responsible for international operations and for the development and implementation of a British strategy against illegal immigration. From 2006 Wainwright held the post of head of the international department of the UK's Serious Organised Crime Agency (SOCA).

In April 2009, Wainwright was appointed Director of Europol, the European Police Office, being the first Director without a police background or belonging to a national police force.

He leads a staff of over 800 personnel who support law enforcement authorities in the 27 EU Member States to tackle international organised crime. The agency handles over 18 000 cross–border cases per year in areas such as drugs, human trafficking, cybercrime, intellectual property crime, cigarette smuggling, Euro counterfeiting, money laundering and asset tracing, outlaw motorcycle gangs, and terrorism.

Wainwright and other EU citizens witnessed the reform of Europol's legal framework as it became a formal EU agency on 1 January 2010. Through this process Europol claimed to have acquired a stronger mandate and new capabilities.

On 1 July 2011, Wainwright hosted HM Queen Beatrix of the Netherlands as she officially opened Europol's new headquarters in The Hague. In March 2012, the Council of Justice and Home Affairs extended Wainwright's term of office as Director of Europol until 2017. It was subsequently extended until 1 May 2018, after which he was succeeded by Catherine De Bolle.

Personal life 
Wainwright is married and has three children. His interests include literature and history.

He has said society accepts that intercepting private phone calls is "a reasonable way to run a democracy".

References

External links 

 Profile of Rob Wainwright from Europol

1967 births
Living people
Detectives
Chiefs of police
British civil servants
People from Carmarthen
Alumni of the London School of Economics
Europol
MI5 personnel
Knights Commander of the Order of St Michael and St George